Southern Oregon Starphire FC was an American soccer team based in Medford, Oregon, United States. The team played in Pacific Premier League (PPL), a regional amateur league based in Northern California, then later in the United Premier Soccer League. 

The team played its home games at Walter A. Philips Field at Ashland High School in Ashland, Oregon, and Spiegelberg Stadium in Medford, Oregon.

History
Founded by Jay Coster in 2000 as Southern Oregon Fuego, the club existed as an exhibition team for approximately ten years before joining the NPSL in 2009. Southern Oregon regularly hosted exhibition matches against teams such as the Cascade Surge of the USL PDL, local college teams or collections of area all-stars.

In 2009 it was announced that the Fuego would be playing as a member of the National Premier Soccer League in the Western Division.

In their first NPSL season Southern Oregon Fuego made the divisional playoffs while posting a 4-7-1 record and finishing fourth in the Western Division. Fuego were eliminated in the semifinal losing to eventual NPSL champion Sonoma County Sol 4–1.  The club left NPSL after two seasons, competing in non-league matches.  They would later change ownership.

As of 2018, the Starphire FC became members of the United Premier Soccer League.     The team has since folded.

Season-by-season

Head coaches
  Dave Kaufman (2009–2012)
  Caleb Peterson (2013-2014)
  Eisa Tiaa Tutu (2016-2017)

Stadium
 US Cellular Community Park; Medford, Oregon (2009–present)

References

External links
 Official site

National Premier Soccer League teams
Soccer clubs in Oregon
Sports in Medford, Oregon
2009 establishments in Oregon
Association football clubs established in 2009